Nueva Hespérides International Airport  is an airport serving Salto,  the capital of Salto Department in Uruguay.

The airport was formerly served by Transporte Aéreo Militar Uruguayo and Aviasur, but currently has no scheduled air service. There are plans to modernize and resume air service between Salto and Carrasco International Airport in Montevideo.

The Salto VOR-DME (Ident: STO) and non-directional beacon (Ident: ST) are located on the field.

Accidents and incidents
20 June 1977: a Transporte Aéreo Militar Uruguayo Embraer EMB110C Bandeirante registration CX-BJE/T584 flying from Montevideo to Salto crashed after striking trees in an orange grove during approach to Salto. The crew of 2 and 3 of the 13 passengers died.

See also

Transport in Uruguay
List of airports in Uruguay

References

External links
OpenStreetMap - Salto
OurAirports - Nueva Hesperides International Airport

Airports in Uruguay
Buildings and structures in Salto Department